Leimonis is a genus of lichen-forming fungi in the family Pilocarpaceae. It has 2 species. The genus was circumscribed by lichenologist Richard C. Harris in 2009.

References

Pilocarpaceae
Lichen genera
Lecanorales genera
Taxa described in 2009